The 1821 Maine gubernatorial election took place on September 10, 1821.

Incumbent acting Democratic-Republican Governor William D. Williamson became Governor in May 1821 when Governor William King resigned. Williamson did not stand for re-election but successfully stood for election to the U.S. House of Representatives.

Democratic-Republican candidate Albion Parris defeated Federalist candidate Ezekiel Whitman and Democratic-Republican Joshua Wingate, Jr.

Williamson would resign as Governor in December 1821 and be followed in office as acting Governor by Benjamin Ames and Daniel Rose before Parris took office in January 1822.

Results

Notes

References 

Gubernatorial
Maine
1821
Maine gubernatorial elections